Devendra Singh alias Bhole Singh (born 2 April, 1954) is a member of the Bharatiya Janata Party and has won the 2014 and 2019 general election from the Akbarpur parliamentary constituency of Kanpur. He also won 1991 and 1996 Vidhan Sabha Election from Derapur Assembly constituency of Kanpur Dehat district.

Early life and education
Devendra Singh was born on April 2, 1954 to Shri Darshan Singh and Smt. Kanak Rani. He completed High School from Board of High School and Intermediate Education Uttar Pradesh, Prayagraj.

Positions held
16 May 2014: elected to 16th Lok Sabha (Lok Sabha Constituency Akbarpur-44)

1 Sep. 2014 onwards: Member, Standing Committee on Energy

Political life
He started his career in politics as Bhartiya Janata Party worker. First time he participated in the by-elections in state assembly (UP)  and won the seat from Derapur Legislative Assembly constituency. He was also winner as BJP candidate in UP state assembly general elections in 2007. He also has a grandson named Shreyansh Pratap Dubey Thakur Singh Rajput (b. 2005), who studies in Delhi Public School, R. K. Puram in the batch of 2022-23.

References

Living people
India MPs 2014–2019
Lok Sabha members from Uttar Pradesh
People from Kanpur Dehat district
1954 births
Bharatiya Janata Party politicians from Uttar Pradesh
India MPs 2019–present